Nine Mile Creek is a rural locality in the Rockhampton Region, Queensland, Australia.

Education 
There are no schools in Nine Mile Creek. The nearest government primary and secondary schools are Mount Morgan State School and Mount Morgan State High School, both in Mount Morgan to the north-west.

References 

Suburbs of Rockhampton Region
Localities in Queensland